Thomas Hollow is a valley in Barry and McDonald Counties in the U.S. state of Missouri.

Thomas Hollow has the name of the local Thomas family.

References

Valleys of Barry County, Missouri
Valleys of McDonald County, Missouri
Valleys of Missouri